Aalwar is a 2007 Indian Tamil-language action drama film directed by Chella Ayyavu and produced by Mohan Natarajan. The film stars Ajith Kumar, Asin and Keerthi Chawla. Lal, Vivek, Shwetha Bandekar and Aditya Srivastava appearing in other pivotal roles. The film's score and soundtrack is by Srikanth Deva while the cinematography was by G. Ramesh. The film released on 12 January 2007 to highly negative reviews and became a commercial failure.

Plot
Aalwar is a Hindu priest in Madurai and he is devoted to his mother and sister. But Punniyamoorthy and his brothers, the heir of the Temple were Aalwar works as priest, kill Aalwar's sister and mother due to an old dispute with Aalwar. Aalwar, with revenge ringing in his mind, ends up as a killer, even while working as a ward boy in a hospital. He rechristens himself as Mortuary Shiva and is out to make a statement against the venal forces. He sees himself as some kind of avatar. In fact, he bumps off the baddies under the getup of Lord Rama and Lord Krishna. In the climax, Shiva turns up as Lord Narasimha and bumps off the last villain by placing him on his thighs and ripping apart his bowels and chest with his sharp claws. He successfully escapes from the police of Chennai and continues his process of "Dharma".

Cast

Production
Ajith teamed up with a debutant Chella for a film to be produced by Mohan Natarajan. Chella had previously worked as an associate to S. J. Suryah. The film held its photo session on 20 July 2006 with Asin being selected once again while Ramesh G was chosen as cinematographer. The film began at the Ramoji Rao Studios in Hyderabad in August 2006, with ajith putting on weight for the film. A couple of songs were filmed in Switzerland as the film geared up for a Pongal release. Shalini, Ajith's wife, was the costume designer for Ajith in the film.

Soundtrack

Release
The film opened on 12 January 2007 to highly negative reviews from critics, with Sify.com  praising Ajith and Asin's performances but criticized the plot of the movie by labelling it as  a "built on a predictable premise" . Another critic described the film as "below average" citing that "the biggest drawback is that the story does not have a strong plot or surprising twists and that "there is also a palpable lack of chemistry between the characters and this gives the picture a poorly contrived feel." Rediff.com's review concluded that "Chella's directorial debut lacks originality and is a hotch potch of celebrated scripts of the past. The film was a disaster at the box office and was considered as the one of the worst movies in Ajith Kumar's career."

References

External links
 

2007 films
2007 action films
2007 drama films
2000s Tamil-language films
2000s masala films
Indian films about revenge
Films scored by Srikanth Deva
2007 directorial debut films